Fedashkuyeh (also Romanized as Fedashkūyeh, Fedeshkūyeh, and Fedshkūyeh; also known as Fāshkūyeh, Fedeshkūh, Fidishkun, and Fīdūshkūh) is a village in Fedashkuyeh Rural District, Shibkaveh District, Fasa County, Fars Province, Iran. At the 2006 census, its population was 4,686, in 1,114 families.

References 

Populated places in Fasa County